Billings House may refer to:

 Billings House (Florida), Liberty Billing's historic house in Florida

 Billings Estate Museum, a historic residence in Ottawa, Ontario
 Swift-Kyle House, a historic residence in Columbus, Georgia
 Frederick Billings House, a historic house in Cambridge, Massachusetts